Montizón is a city located in the province of Jaén, Spain. According to the 2014 census, the municipality has a population of 1,797 inhabitants.

See also
La Carolina
Sierra Morena

References

External links

Montizón - Sistema de Información Multiterritorial de Andalucía

Municipalities in the Province of Jaén (Spain)